The American Poster Institute (API) is a California nonprofit corporation dedicated to promoting poster art and serving poster artists. Among the API's stated goals are: (1) support for the community of artists creating entertainment-related posters; (2) fostering interaction and communication between these artists: (3) constantly improving standards in the field; and (4) furthering public awareness and appreciation of the art form. Based in San Francisco, the API was formed in 2002 by a small group of poster artists and supporters.

Each year API organizes two or more FLATSTOCK poster exhibitions to showcase the work of its members. These exhibitions typically feature as many as 100 poster artists from all over the US, overseas, and Canada.  The first FLATSTOCK show was held in San Francisco in 2002. Each Spring since March 2003, the FLATSTOCK show has been part of the South by Southwest Music Conference (SXSW) in Austin, Texas, and it has been a part of the Bumbershoot Music Festival in Seattle each Fall.

References

External links
 American Poster Institute web site
 FLATSTOCK web site

American artist groups and collectives
Posters
Art exhibitions in the United States
Arts organizations based in the San Francisco Bay Area
Non-profit organizations based in San Francisco
Arts organizations established in 2002
2002 establishments in California